Military sports are sports practiced by the military. They are the subject of international competitions, such as the Military World Games, with an objective relating to the physical training of military. Particular sports may be chosen to improve combat readiness, skill, toughness, the development of physical qualities of the warfighter, and professional proficiency based on the different areas of the military action: land, sea and air.

History

 

In 1858 Archibald MacLaren opened a gymnasium at the University of Oxford, England and in 1860 instituted a training regimen for 12 non-commissioned officers and their officer Major Frederick Hammersley at the university. This regimen was assimilated into the training of the British Army, which formed the Army Gymnastic Staff in 1861 and made sport an important part of military life. 

In the United States, the first Inter-service Sports Council (ISSC) meeting was held in 1947. Today, Armed Forces Sports in the U.S. are run through the Department of Defense. 

Since its foundation in 1948, the purpose of the International Military Sports Council (IMSC; or Conseil International du Sport Militarie (CISM)) was to organize and structure a body that would adapt and serve as physical training for the different branches of the armed forces.

Sports
There are 26 disciplines recognized by CISM; some are exclusively military sports.

Aeronautical pentathlon*
Basketball
Boxing
Cross country running
Cycling (Cyclo-cross, Mountain biking, and Road)
Equestrian (Dressage, Endurance, Eventing, and Jumping)
Fencing
Football
Golf
Handball
Judo
Marathon
Military pentathlon*

Modern pentathlon
Naval pentathlon*
Orienteering
Parachuting (Accuracy landing and Formation skydiving)
Sailing
Shooting
Skiing (Alpine, Biathlon, Cross-country, Mountaineering, Orienteering, and Patrol)
Swimming (includes Lifesaving)
Taekwondo
Track and field
Triathlon
Volleyball (indoor and beach)
Wrestling

Short track speed skating and sport climbing have also been contested at the CISM World Winter Games.

Notes:
* — purely military sport

See also
 History of physical training and fitness
International Military Sports Council
 Invictus Games
Military World Games
 Tank biathlon
Warrior Games
World Military Championships
International Army Games

References

External links
 
 

 
Sports by type